Gerward was a bishop of Poznan about 1187 though his exact Name and date are unsure. A number of persons are believed to have been Bishop following the tenure of Arnold, including Piotr Łabędź and Świętosław.

References

Bishops of Poznań
12th-century Roman Catholic bishops in Poland
Year of birth unknown
Year of death unknown